Danila Botha is a Canadian author and novelist.  She has published two short story collections, with a third to be published in 2024  and two novels, with the second to be published in 2025.

Personal life and work 
Botha was born in Johannesburg, South Africa in 1982. She is Jewish, and is of Moroccan Israeli and Lithuanian Jewish descent. As well as English, she speaks Hebrew and Afrikaans. She moved to Toronto with her family as a teenager. She studied Creative Writing at York University, and at the Humber College School for Writers.

She volunteered with Na-me-res and Ve'ahavta, organizations benefiting the homeless, which inspired many of the short stories in Got No Secrets, her first book, published by Tightrope Books in Canada in May 2010, and Modjaji Books in South Africa in 2012. The stories, which deal with addiction, abuse, suicide, and childhood, are journeys into the private lives of twelve women.

Botha has lived in South Africa, Ra'anana, Israel and Halifax, Nova Scotia, all of which informed her character's experiences in her debut novel. Too Much on the Inside, which was published in May 2015 by Quattro Books, follows four newcomers to Toronto who struggle with their pasts, their new home and falling in love.

Too Much on the Inside was reviewed by Quill and Quire Magazine, The Literary Review of Canada, and Book Clubbish. Botha's novel was described as an "extraordinary...narrative, which... reveals a deep understanding of human nature." and writing which contains "an admirable freshness and enthusiasm." It won a Book Excellence Award for Contemporary Novel in 2016. It was also short listed for the 2016 ReLit Award, in the Novels Category. It was optioned for film or episodic series by Pelee Entertainment in 2023. 

Her sophomore collection of short stories, For All the Men (and Some of the Women) I've Known, was published in October 2016 by Tightrope Books. It received a starred review in Quill and Quire Magazine, who called it her "most triumphant work to date." The Toronto Star praised her "fine talent for putting emphasis in unexpected places." while the Globe and Mail praised the stories' "admirable directness and grit". The Winnipeg Review praised her for "speaking smartly, even boldly... [and]repaint [ing] the stoic male canvasses of Cheever and Carver, but with a sensing, reflective affect" In May 2017, it was a named a finalist for the Trillium Book Award. It was also short listed for the Vine Award for Canadian Jewish Literature.

Her new collection of short stories, Things That Cause Inappropriate Happiness, will be published by Guernica Editions in 2024. Stories from it have appeared in the Humber Literary Review, the anthology Changing the Face of Canadian Literature, and are forthcoming on Jewishfiction.net.  

Her fifth book, and second novel, A Place For People Like Us will be published by Guernica Editions in 2025. 

She holds an  MFA in creative writing from the University of Guelph. She has contributed to the National Post's the Afterword, The Huffington Post and the 49th Shelf The Hamilton Review of Books and was the Writer in Residence for Open Book in September 2016. She was the 2021-2022 Writer in Residence at Toronto's Heliconian Club. She is a Creative Writing instructor at University of Toronto's School of Continuing Studies and part of the faculty at Humber College's School for Writers.

She lives in Toronto with her husband and kids.

Bibliography

Short Story Collections 
 Got No Secrets 2010 (Tightrope Books)
 For All the Men (and Some of the Women) I've Known 2016 (Tightrope Books)
 Things That Cause Inappropriate Happiness 2024 (Guernica Editions)

Novels 
 Too Much on the Inside 2015 (Quattro Books)
 A Place for People Like Us 2025 (Guernica Editions)

Sources

External links
 http://www.danilabotha.com/     (Official Webpage)
 http://quattrobooks.ca/books/too-much-on-the-inside (Quattro Books Author Page)
 https://web.archive.org/web/20150910020213/http://www.openbooktoronto.com/news/proust_questionnaire_with_danila_botha (Open Book Toronto Author Questionnaire)
 https://web.archive.org/web/20120129101309/http://www.openbooktoronto.com/rob_mclennans_12_or_20_questions_with_danila_botha (Open Book Toronto interview with Danila Botha)
 http://www.thecoast.ca/halifax/got-no-secrets/Content?oid=1729179 (Halifax Coast Book Review of Got No Secrets)
 http://arts.nationalpost.com/tag/danila-botha/ (National Post articles written by Danila Botha)
 

1982 births
Afrikaner Jews
South African journalists
21st-century Canadian novelists
Living people
Canadian women novelists
Journalists from Toronto
South African emigrants to Canada
People from Johannesburg
Canadian women short story writers
White South African people
21st-century Canadian women writers
Writers from Toronto
21st-century Canadian short story writers
Canadian women non-fiction writers